Megalong is a small rural community in the Megalong Valley in the state of New South Wales, Australia in the City of Blue Mountains. At the 2006 census, Megalong had a population of 164 people.

The community is mainly quiet rural properties surrounded by the spectacular scenery of the Blue Mountains escarpment. Attractions of the area are bushwalking and horse riding.

Notes and references

External links
 Megalong Valley
 Megalong Heritage Guide
 Megalong Tea Rooms

Towns in New South Wales
Suburbs of the City of Blue Mountains